The Roman Catholic Diocese of De Aar is a diocese located in the city of De Aar (Pixley ka Seme District Municipality) in the Ecclesiastical province of Cape Town in South Africa.

History
 March 24, 1953: Established as Apostolic Prefecture of De Aar from Diocese of Aliwal
 April 13, 1967: Promoted as Diocese of De Aar

Special churches
 The cathedral is Cathedral of Our Lady of the Assumption in De Aar.

Leadership
 Prefect Apostolic of De Aar (Roman rite) 
 Fr. Louis Dettmer (1953.03.24 – 1967.04.13)
 Bishops of De Aar (Roman rite)
 Bishop Joseph Anthony De Palma, S.C.I. (1967.04.13 – 1987.11.18)
 Bishop Joseph James Potocnak, S.C.I. (1992.01.23 - 2009.07.17)
 Bishop Adam Leszek Musialek, S.C.I. (since 2009.07.17 - )

See also
Roman Catholicism in South Africa
www.diocesedeaar.com

References

External links
 GCatholic.org 
 Catholic Hierarchy 

Roman Catholic dioceses in South Africa
Christian organizations established in 1953
Roman Catholic dioceses and prelatures established in the 20th century
1953 establishments in South Africa
Roman Catholic Ecclesiastical Province of Cape Town
Pixley ka Seme District Municipality